The Organization of Iranian American Communities (OIAC) is an organization in the United States.

The OIAC is allied with the People's Mojahedin Organization of Iran, or the Mojahedin-e Khalq (MEK), which advocates the overthrow of the government of Iran.

History
OIAC is an Iranian-American organization dedicated to the promotion of a free and democratic Iran where human rights are celebrated, where different religious traditions are honored, and where every Iranian citizen feels safe and able to pursue their individual dreams and aspirations. The Organization of Iranian-American Communities-US was originally established in 1997. In 2012, Iranian-American interest groups from 40 states joined forces to collaborate and work toward a vision of bringing peaceful, democratic change to Iran. OIAC is now the largest organization of Iranian-Americans in the US and serves as a powerful Iranian-American advocacy group. OIAC recognizes that a peaceful, free Iran requires an alternate government rather than the religious fascism which now engulfs Iran today. OIAC works toward that goal by supporting the efforts of Iranians in Iran to reform their government and by showcasing Persian-American culture here in the United States. Majid Sadeghpour is currently the Political Director of the organization. 

OIAC does not support a foreign war, nor does it support an appeasement policy towards Iran. More specifically, OIAC supports the 10-point plans by Mrs. Maryam Rajavi for a democratic Iran that aligns with security for America and peace in the Middle East and beyond. OIAC works in collaboration with all Iranian-Americans and concerned citizens across the country to achieve its mission and vision. OIAC holds yearly protests outside the United Nations building against Iranian Presidents and at times outside the White House "in solidarity with protesters in Iran". According to Joanne Stocker, "the Organization of Iranian American Communities have played a crucial role in securing broad, bipartisan support in the United States for the opposition group by successfully portraying the group as a democratic, human rights-supporting alternative to the current regime." OIAC and its events have been targeted by Iranian regime and its terrorist proxies.

As of 2022, OIAC continues to fight for freedom and democracy in Iran through advocacy, awareness, and financial means.

Leadership 
OIAC is led by political director Majid Sadeghpour. OIAC has a 3 members on the board of directors,8 members on the board of advisors., and 7 members in the governing body.

Events 
OIAC is a major proponent of the Free Iran World Summit, the largest international event dedicated to liberating Iran from its oppressive leadership and paving the way for a free and democratic Iran. Pro-Democracy activists, both in the U.S. and in Iran, attend this annual event. Some notable participants include Former U.S. Secretary of State Mike Pompeo, Prime Minister of Slovenia Janez Jansa, and U.S Senator Ted Cruz. In total, over 11 prime ministers, 30 U.S lawmakers, and numerous U.N. representatives have participated in this event. 

OIAC also holds regular briefing events, which provide insight and commentary around the evolving Iranian political landscape. Over 30 U.S. senators and House members have spoken at these briefings, all of which showing staunch support for the resistance.

See also
 Iranian Americans
 Iranian diaspora
 Iran–United States relations

References

External links
 

Iranian-American organizations
Iran–United States relations
2012 establishments in Washington, D.C.
Lobbying organizations based in Washington, D.C.
People's Mojahedin Organization of Iran